Wilfred Smith Haney (January 3, 1899 – December 16, 1947) was an Ontario barrister and political figure. He represented Lambton West in the Legislative Assembly of Ontario from 1923 to 1929 as a Conservative member.

He was born in Sarnia, Ontario, in 1899, the son of William Henry Haney, and educated in Sarnia and at Osgoode Hall. Haney served overseas with the Royal Naval Air Service during World War I. In 1922, he married Joan Cheney. He was a member of the Sarnia Board of Education. Haney ran unsuccessfully for a seat in the House of Commons in 1930. He died of an illness of three weeks in 1947.

References 

 Canadian Parliamentary Guide, 1925, EJ Chambers

External links 

1899 births
1947 deaths
People from Sarnia
Progressive Conservative Party of Ontario MPPs
Royal Naval Air Service personnel of World War I